Viktor Danilovich Saneyev (3 October 1945 – 3 January 2022) was a Georgian triple jumper who competed internationally for the USSR. He won four Olympic medals – three golds (1968, 1972 and 1976) and one silver (1980). Saneyev set the world record on three occasions.
He was born in Sukhumi, Georgian SSR, trained in Sukhumi and Tbilisi, and died in Sydney.

Athletics career
Saneyev was born into a poor family, with a disabled and paralyzed father who died when Saneyev was 15 years old. He took up athletics in 1956, training in the high jump at the Gantiadi boarding school; his first coach was Akop Kerselyan. Six years later Kerselyan advised him to specialize in the triple jump. In 1963 Saneyev finished third in his first All-Union competition – Schoolchildren's Spartakiad. 
 
His first major success came in 1968, when he won both the USSR Championships and the 1968 Summer Olympics, where on 17 October he set the World Record twice, 17.23 m and 17.39 m. On the same date four years later, in Sukhumi, Saneyev improved the World Record to 17.44 m. He won gold medals at the 1972 Summer Olympics and at the 1976 Summer Olympics and a silver at the 1980 Summer Olympics.

He also won the 1969 and 1974 European Championships, the 1970, 1971, 1972, 1975, 1976 and 1977 European Athletics Indoor Championships. Saneyev was USSR champion in 1968–71, 1973–75 and 1978.

1980 Olympics

Saneyev came to the 1980 Olympics hoping for a fourth gold medal, though he understood that several jumpers had better chances for a gold, especially the world record holder João Carlos de Oliveira of Brazil. Soviet Jaak Uudmäe won the gold medal (17.35 m), followed by Saneyev (17.24 m) and Oliveira (17.22 m). The event was marred by controversial judging. Five out of seven jumps by Australia's Ian Campbell were discarded, as well as four jumps by De Oliveira; Uudmäe had two fouls and Saneyev one. All IAAF inspectors were pulled out of the field on the day of the triple jump final and replaced by Soviet staff.

Both Campbell and De Oliveira jumped beyond Uudmäe's leading mark more than once, but all of these jumps were discarded despite protests. The longest of Campbell's jumps was ruled a "scrape" foul: the officials claimed his trailing leg had touched the track during the step phase, though it was unlikely to scrape and jump that far. Saneyev did not contest his foul, though it also fell on his strongest jump. He later noted that the winning jump by Uudmäe was likely overstepped. Saneyev retired after the 1980 Olympics.

Honors
He was awarded the Order of the Red Banner of Labour in 1969, Order of Lenin in 1972, and Order of Friendship of Peoples in 1976. At the 1980 Games he was selected as an Olympic torch bearer, though this honor is usually given to retired athletes. In retirement, he headed the USSR jumping team for four years, and later worked at his formative club, Dynamo Tbilisi.

Later life and death
In the early 1990s, after the Soviet Union broke up and a civil war started in Georgia, Saneyev lost his job and moved to Australia with his wife and 15-year-old son. His brief coaching contract soon expired, and Saneyev was about to sell his Olympic medals to feed his family. He reconsidered at the last moment and took odd jobs instead, such as pizza delivery. He found a regular job as a physical education teacher at St Joseph's College, Hunters Hill, and later as the jumping coach at the New South Wales Institute of Sport.

Saneyev had graduated from the Georgian State University of Subtropical Agriculture and Tbilisi State University, and enjoyed growing subtropical plants in his backyard, including lemons and grapefruits. He died on 3 January 2022, at the age of 76.

References

Further reading

External links

 
 
 
 
 Viktor Saneyev at sporting-heroes.net

1945 births
2022 deaths
Sportspeople from Sukhumi
Soviet male triple jumpers
Male triple jumpers from Georgia (country)
Georgian people of Russian descent
Olympic athletes of the Soviet Union
Olympic gold medalists for the Soviet Union
Olympic silver medalists for the Soviet Union
Dynamo sports society athletes
Athletes (track and field) at the 1968 Summer Olympics
Athletes (track and field) at the 1972 Summer Olympics
Athletes (track and field) at the 1976 Summer Olympics
Athletes (track and field) at the 1980 Summer Olympics
European Athletics Championships medalists
World record setters in athletics (track and field)
Recipients of the Order of Lenin
Recipients of the Order of Friendship of Peoples
Expatriate sportspeople in Australia
Medalists at the 1980 Summer Olympics
Medalists at the 1976 Summer Olympics
Medalists at the 1972 Summer Olympics
Medalists at the 1968 Summer Olympics
Olympic gold medalists in athletics (track and field)
Olympic silver medalists in athletics (track and field)
Universiade medalists in athletics (track and field)
Universiade gold medalists for the Soviet Union
Recipients of the Presidential Order of Excellence
Medalists at the 1970 Summer Universiade
Medalists at the 1973 Summer Universiade